Fatai Ayinla-Adekunle (6 May 1939 – 12 October 2016) was an amateur boxer from Nigeria, who won the gold medal in the men's heavyweight division (+ 81 kg) at the 1973 All-Africa Games in Lagos, Nigeria. He was born in Ibadan, Oyo. Ayinla represented his native country twice at the Summer Olympics: in 1968 and 1972. He claimed a bronze medal at the first World Amateur Boxing Championships in Havana, Cuba (1974).

1972 Olympic results
Below is the record of Fatai Ayinla, a Nigerian heavyweight boxer who competed at the 1972 Munich Olympics:

 Round of 16: lost to Carroll Morgan (Canada) by decision, 2-3

References

Article - The Death of Nigerian Sports And A Walk Down Memory Lane

1939 births
2016 deaths
Sportspeople from Ibadan
Yoruba sportspeople
Heavyweight boxers
Boxers at the 1968 Summer Olympics
Boxers at the 1972 Summer Olympics
Olympic boxers of Nigeria
Commonwealth Games gold medallists for Nigeria
Commonwealth Games silver medallists for Nigeria
Boxers at the 1966 British Empire and Commonwealth Games
Boxers at the 1970 British Commonwealth Games
Boxers at the 1974 British Commonwealth Games
Nigerian male boxers
AIBA World Boxing Championships medalists
Commonwealth Games medallists in boxing
African Games gold medalists for Nigeria
African Games medalists in boxing
Boxers at the 1973 All-Africa Games
Medallists at the 1966 British Empire and Commonwealth Games
Medallists at the 1970 British Commonwealth Games
Medallists at the 1974 British Commonwealth Games